The Eurovision Young Musicians 2004 was the twelfth edition of the Eurovision Young Musicians, held at the Culture and Congress Centre in Lucerne, Switzerland on 27 May 2004. Organised by the European Broadcasting Union (EBU) and host broadcaster Swiss Broadcasting Corporation (SRG SSR), musicians from seven countries participated in the televised final. A total of seventeen countries took part in the competition therefore a semi-final was held in the same venue on 22 and 23 May 2004. All participants performed a classical piece of their choice accompanied by the Lucerne Symphony Orchestra, conducted by Christian Arming.

Czech Republic, Denmark, Italy and Latvia withdrew from the 2004 contest, whilst Belgium returned.  was listed as the 18th participant, performing 9th at the first day of semi-finals, however in the end did not take part or broadcast the contest.

Alexandra Soumm of Austria won the contest, with Germany and Russia placing second and third respectively.

Location

Lucerne Culture and Congress Centre, was the host venue for the 2004 edition of the Eurovision Young Musicians. It was built according to the plans of the architect Jean Nouvel and was inaugurated in 1998 with a concert by the Berlin Philharmonic Orchestra under the direction of Claudio Abbado.

Format
Christian Arming was the host of the 2004 contest. For the first time, the host and the conductor was the same person.

Results

Preliminary round
A total of seventeen countries took part in the preliminary round of the 2004 contest, of which seven qualified to the televised grand final. The following countries failed to qualify.

 Cyprus

Final 
Awards were given to the top three countries. The table below highlights these using gold, silver, and bronze. The placing results of the remaining participants is unknown and never made public by the European Broadcasting Union.

Jury members 
The jury members consisted of the following:

 – Michael Haefliger (head)
 – Harold Clarkson
 – Mihaela Ursuleasa
 – Bruno Giuranna
 – Milan Turković
/ – Harvey Sachs

Broadcasting
The competition was transmitted live over the Eurovision Network by the participating broadcasters. The Final was also broadcast by the Swiss radio channels and was also shown in Canada and Australia.

See also
 Eurovision Song Contest 2004
 Junior Eurovision Song Contest 2004

References

External links 
 

Eurovision Young Musicians by year
2004 in music
2004 in Switzerland
Music festivals in Switzerland
Events in Lucerne
May 2004 events in Europe